Great Ditch is a drainage ditch that drains areas of the Pigeon Swamp State Park in New Jersey in the United States.

Course

Purpose
This canal's purpose is to drain sections of the Pigeon Swamp to prevent flooding of Deans Rhode Hall Road, which passes through the swamp.

Sister tributaries
Beaverdam Brook
Ireland Brook
Oakeys Brook
Sawmill Brook 
Sucker Brook
Terhune Run
Unnamed Brook in Rutgers Gardens, unofficially named Doc Brook
Unnamed Brook in Rutgers' Helyar Woods

See also
List of rivers of New Jersey

References

External links
USGS Coordinates in Google Maps

Canals in New Jersey
Tributaries of the Raritan River
Bodies of water of Middlesex County, New Jersey